South African Shooting Sport Confederation (SASSCo) formerly known as South African Shooting Sport Federation (SASSF) is the governing body for shooting sports in South Africa.
SASSCo is the highest body responsible for the development and promotion of target shooting sports in South Africa. SASSCo is registered with both SASCOC and Sport and Recreation South Africa (SRSA) as the officially recognised overall federation for shooting sports in South Africa, and is also affiliated to the International Shooting Sport Federation (ISSF) and the African Shooting Sport Federation (ASSF).

History 
The South African Shooters Union (SASU) was established in the 1990s as a result of the need for only one representative federation governing each sporting activity in South Africa as required by government's policy. The International Shooting Sport Federation (ISSF), the world governing body for shooting sports subsequently suggested a name change to South African Shooting Sport Federation (SASSF).

SASSF's (now South African Shooting Sport Confederation (SASSCo)) affiliate member associations compete in International Olympic Committee (IOC) events in addition to non-IOC sanctioned events. SASSF holds the international affiliation from ISSF on behalf of the Olympic events-member associations while the non-Olympic events-member associations competing in international competitions hold the international affiliation for those events.

Affiliates
This is a list of affiliates of SASSCo.
 Confederation of Hunters Associations of SA Sport - CHASA 
 COMPAK South Africa - COMPAK SA 
 Clay Target Shooting Association of South Africa - CTSASA 
 Lowveld Sport Shooting Association - LSSA 
 South African Air Rifle Association - SAARA 
 South African Benchrest Shooting Federation  - SABSF 
 South African Bisley Union - SABU 
 South African Combat Rifle Association - SACRA 
 South African Field Target Airgun Association - SAFTAA 
 South African Hunting Rifle Association - SAHRA 
 SA Hunters and Game Conservation Association - SAJWV/SAHGCA 
 South African Metallic Silhouette Shooting Association - SAMSSA 
 SA Pistol Association - SAPA 
 South African Paintball Association - SAPBA 
 South African Practical Shooting Association - SAPSA 
 South African Pin Shooting Federation - SAPSF 
 South African Precision Shooting Federation - SAPSSF 
 South African Target Rifle Association - SATRA 

Affiliates and sport shooting clubs help in the promotion and development of the various codes and disciplines of sport shooting among all enthusiasts across various age and gender groups in South Africa with tournaments being held to boost the popularity of the sport. Sport shooting is a small but growing sport in South Africa with schools also investing in facilities and coaching.

Tournaments

Sport shooters

See also
 Sports in South Africa
 List of shooting sports organizations

References

External links
 
 International Shooting Sport Federation website

Shooting sports in South Africa
Sports governing bodies in South Africa